Kristian James Thomas (born 14 February 1989 in Wolverhampton) is a British former artistic gymnast. A long-standing member of both the England and Great Britain men's teams, he was a member of the British team that won gold in the 2012 European Championships team event, and a historic bronze in the same event at the 2012 Summer Olympics. He won his first global individual medal in the 2013 World Championships, a bronze in vault; it was also the first global medal ever won in vault by a British male gymnast. In 2015 he won his first major international title, gold in the floor exercise at the 2015 European Artistic Gymnastics Championships.

Thomas was coached by Michelle Bradley and Alexei Popov, and is a member of the Earls gymnastics club. He was born in Wolverhampton.

On 19 October 2017 Kristian announced his retirement from gymnastics.

Junior career
In 2006, Thomas attended the Commonwealth Games in Melbourne, Australia, where he placed 12th and helped the English gymnastics team win the bronze medal.

Senior career
Thomas rose to prominence in British gymnastics, when he won the British all-around title in 2008. Floor is his best event, and during his Senior career he has won several silver medals on floor in International competitions. At the 2009 World Artistic Gymnastics Championships in London, he placed 6th in the All-Around. He was also part of the British men's team that represented Great Britain at the 2010 World Artistic Gymnastics Championships in Rotterdam and the 2011 World Artistic Gymnastics Championships in Tokyo.

After the men's team initially failed to qualify to the 2012 Summer Olympics in London, Thomas gave a solid performance at the London Prepares FIG Olympic Test event. The men's team qualified more than 7 points ahead of the silver medal team, France, and Thomas placed 2nd in the All-Around behind teammate Daniel Purvis, as well as qualifying to several finals. In the finals he won a Bronze on Floor, Bronze on Vault and Gold on High Bar.

2012

Summer Olympics in London

At the London Olympics, Thomas was part of the bronze medal-winning GB men's team, competing on 30 July 2012 at the North Greenwich Arena .
In this team final, he vaulted with a massive score of 16.550.

In October, 2013, Thomas competed at the 2013 World Artistic Gymnastics Championships in Antwerp, Belgium. In the vault final, he won the bronze with the score of 15.233, behind Yang Hak-Seon and Steven Legendre.

2014

European Championships

On May 19–25, 2014, at the 2014 European Championships in Sofia. Thomas along with his teammates (Daniel Keatings, Daniel Purvis, Max Whitlock, Sam Oldham) won Team Great Britain the silver medal behind Russia with a total score of 262.087 points. In event finals, Thomas won the bronze medal in high bar (14.808) behind teammate Sam Oldham.

Commonwealth Games

In July and August, at the 2014 Commonwealth Games held in Glasgow, Thomas contributed a score of 58.599 for the England team and won gold. He qualified for the vault final with a score of 15.100, and also finished in 8th in the Floor final. With a score of 15.033 he also qualified for the Horizontal bar final. He won a silver for vault with a score 14.499, coming behind Canadian gymnast Scott Morgan. Thomas scored 14.966 on Horizontal Bar, matching teammate Nile Wilson's score, but scoring lower on execution to win silver.

References

 Kristian Thomas, athlete profile on the official site of the 2012 Summer Olympics

British male artistic gymnasts
Commonwealth Games bronze medallists for England
Living people
1989 births
Gymnasts at the 2012 Summer Olympics
Olympic gymnasts of Great Britain
Olympic bronze medallists for Great Britain
Olympic medalists in gymnastics
Medalists at the 2012 Summer Olympics
Gymnasts at the 2014 Commonwealth Games
Medalists at the World Artistic Gymnastics Championships
Commonwealth Games gold medallists for England
Commonwealth Games silver medallists for England
Gymnasts at the 2016 Summer Olympics
Commonwealth Games medallists in gymnastics
Medallists at the 2006 Commonwealth Games
Medallists at the 2014 Commonwealth Games